Naqada III is the last phase of the Naqada culture of ancient Egyptian prehistory, dating from approximately 3200 to 3000 BC. It is the period during which the process of state formation, which began in Naqada II, became highly visible, with named kings heading powerful polities. Naqada III is often referred to as Dynasty 0 or the Protodynastic Period to reflect the presence of kings at the head of influential states, although, in fact, the kings involved would not have been a part of a dynasty. In this period, those kings' names were inscribed in the form of serekhs on a variety of surfaces including pottery and tombs.

History
The Protodynastic Period in ancient Egypt was characterised by an ongoing process of political unification, culminating in the formation of a single state to begin the Early Dynastic Period. Furthermore, it is during this time that the Egyptian language was first recorded in hieroglyphs. There is also strong archaeological evidence of Egyptian settlements in southern Canaan during the Protodynastic Period, which are regarded as colonies or trading entrepôts.

State formation began during this era and perhaps even earlier. Various small city-states arose along the Nile. Centuries of conquest then reduced Upper Egypt to three major states: Thinis, Naqada, and Nekhen. Sandwiched between Thinis and Nekhen, Naqada was the first to fall. Thinis then conquered Lower Egypt. Nekhen's relationship with Thinis is uncertain, but these two states may have merged peacefully, with the Thinite royal family ruling all of Egypt. The Thinite kings were buried at Abydos in the Umm el-Qa'ab cemetery.

Most Egyptologists consider Narmer to be both the last king of this period and the first king of the First Dynasty. He was possibly preceded over some parts of Upper Egypt by Crocodile, Iry-Hor, Ka, and perhaps by the king Scorpion II, whose name may refer to, or be derived from, the goddess Serket, a special early protector of other deities and the rulers.

Naqada III extended all over Egypt and was characterized by some notable firsts:
The first hieroglyphs
The first graphical narratives on palettes
The first regular use of serekhs
The first truly royal cemeteries
Possibly the first example of irrigation

And at best, a notable second:
The invention of sail navigation (independently from its prior invention in the Persian Gulf 2,000 years earlier)
According to the Egypt's Ministry of Antiquities, in February, 2020, Egyptian archaeologists have uncovered 83 tombs dating back to 3,000 B.C, known as the Naqada III period. Various small pottery pots in different shapes and some sea shells, makeup tools, eyeliner pots, and jewels were also revealed in the burial.

Decorative cosmetic palettes

Many notable decorative palettes are dated to Naqada III, such as the Hunters Palette.

Other artifacts

References

Further reading

External links

 Naqada III: Dynasty 0
 .

 
4th millennium BC in Egypt
Predynastic Egypt
Archaeological cultures in Egypt
4th-millennium BC establishments
4th-millennium BC disestablishments